The 1908 Brooklyn Superbas suffered through another poor season, finishing in seventh place. After the season, manager Patsy Donovan was fired. The club set a Major League record which still stands, for the fewest doubles by a team in a season, with only 110. The Superbas hit only .213 as a team, second lowest in the modern era after the 1910 Chicago White Sox.  No regulars hit .250, Tim Jordan led the team with a .247 batting average.

Offseason 
 December 17, 1907: Tommy Sheehan was purchased by the Superbas from the Pittsburgh Pirates.

Regular season

Season standings

Record vs. opponents

Roster

Player stats

Batting

Starters by position 
Note: Pos = Position; G = Games played; AB = At bats; H = Hits; Avg. = Batting average; HR = Home runs; RBI = Runs batted in

Other batters 
Note: G = Games played; AB = At bats; H = Hits; Avg. = Batting average; HR = Home runs; RBI = Runs batted in

Pitching

Starting pitchers 
Note: G = Games pitched; IP = Innings pitched; W = Wins; L = Losses; ERA = Earned run average; SO = Strikeouts

Other pitchers 
Note: G = Games pitched; IP = Innings pitched; W = Wins; L = Losses; ERA = Earned run average; SO = Strikeouts

Relief pitchers 
Note: G = Games pitched; W = Wins; L = Losses; SV = Saves; ERA = Earned run average; SO = Strikeouts

Notes

References 
Baseball-Reference season page
Baseball Almanac season page

External links 
1908 Brooklyn Superbas uniform
Brooklyn Dodgers reference site
Dodgers page
Retrosheet

Los Angeles Dodgers seasons
Brooklyn Superbas season
Brooklyn Superbas
1900s in Brooklyn
Park Slope